Faralimomab is a mouse monoclonal antibody and an immunomodulator.

References

Monoclonal antibodies